The Polada culture (22nd to 16th centuries BC) is the name for a culture of the ancient Bronze Age which spread primarily in the territory of modern-day Lombardy, Veneto and Trentino, characterized by settlements on pile-dwellings.

The name derives from the same locality in the territory of Lonato del Garda in Lombardy where the first findings attributed to this culture were discovered in the years between 1870 and 1875 as a result of intense activities of reclamation in a peat bog; the dating of carbon-14 on the finds place them between c. 1380 BC and c. 1270 BC. Other major sites are found in the area between Mantua, the Lake Garda and the Lake of Pusiano.

It was succeeded in the Middle Bronze Age by the facies of the pile dwellings and of the dammed settlements and the Terramare culture.

Chronology

The Polada culture is usually assigned to the period from 2200 to 1500 BC, or according to A.F. Harding (2000) from 2400 to 1400 BC,  David-Elbiali & David (2009) limit the time span between 2200 and 1750 BC.

The so-called tavolette enigmatiche or Brotlaibidol found at Polada and in the Lago di Ledro date from the more recent period of the South Alpine Early Bronze Age and are correlated with the Polada culture. According to the chronology proposed by Renato Perini, they correspond to the Bronzo Antico II and Bronzo Antico III (Polada-B context). These clay objects can be dated in Italy in a period from 2050 BC (Polada B, Lavagnone 2) to 1400/1300 BC (Lavagnone, Isolone di Mincio).

According to Paul Reinecke's chronological system, the Polada culture is included in the Bronze Age stages BzA2 to BzC2, but according to David-Elbiali & David (2009) only BzA1a, BzA1b and BzA2a, i.e. Early and Developed Early Bronze Age.

The settlement of Lavagnone 1 can be assigned to 2080/2050 BC. Lavagnone 2 existed for 65 years (from 2050 to 1991/1985 BC) and Lavagnone 3 began around 1984 BC.

Origin

There are some commonalities with the previous Bell Beaker Culture including the usage of the bow and a certain mastery in metallurgy. Apart from that, the Polada culture does not correspond to the  Beaker culture nor to the previous Remedello culture. According to Barfield the appearance of Polada facies is connected to the movement of new populations coming from southern Germany and from Switzerland.

Together with the Polada culture in Northern Italy, the following cultures lived around the Alpine arch:

 The Leithaprodersdorf culture and Unterwölblinger culture in Austria
 Straubing culture and Singen culture in Southern Germany
 The Rhône culture in Southern France
 Ljubljana culture in Slovenia

According to Bernard Sergent, the origin of the Ligurian linguistic family (in his opinion distantly related to the Celtic and Italic ones) would have to be found in the Polada and Rhone cultures, southern branches of the Unetice culture.

Diffusion 

Most of the sites attributable to this culture were discovered around the Lake Garda, between eastern Lombardy, Trentino and western Veneto and around the Lago di Viverone and the Lake Maggiore in Piedmont.

Its influences are also found in the cultures of the Early Bronze Age of Liguria, Romagna, Corsica and Sardinia (Bonnanaro culture).

Settlements 

The settlements in the area of lakes and marshes of Moraine are stilt houses resting on "drainage"  of horizontal trunks, arranged in layered platform or cassette. They had a relatively limited extension, about a hectare, and a population between 200 and 300 people per village.

Economy
The economy was based on breeding, hunting, farming, fishing and large-scale berry harvesting.

In a site of this culture, near Solferino, was found the oldest example of domesticated horse in Italy.

Material culture 

If the pottery is still coarse, other human activities grow and develop: lithic industry, in bone and horn, wood and metals. The Bronze tools and weapons show similarities with those of the Unetice Culture and other groups in the north of Alps including the Singen and Straubing groups.

Gallery

Major sites
 
 Polada (Type-site)
 Alba Via Bubbio (Alessandria) 
 Arbedo Castione im Canton Ticino 
 Bande di Cavriana Scavo (Mantua)
 Barche di Solferino (Solferino) 
 Canàr I (Rovigo)
 Castello Valsoda (Como)
 Castione dei Marchesi (Parma) 
 Fiavé 3 (Trento)
 La Quercia di Lazise
 Lago di Ledro
 Lavagnone 4, Lavagnone 3/A und Lavagnone 2/A
 Lucone D
 Palude Brabbia (Varese) 
 Remedello Sopra (Brescia)
 Romagnano (Trento) 
 Saint-Martin de Corléans (Aosta)
 Savignano (Modena) 
 Sorbara di Asola (Mantua) 
 Torbole (Brescia) 
 Vela di Valbusa (Trento)

Paleogenetics 
Male individuals from Trentino in the Bronze Age (Paludei di Volano and Romagnano III) mainly belonged to Haplogroup G-M201, associated with the Early European Farmers.

See also
Unetice culture
Terramare culture
Prehistoric pile dwellings around the Alps

Notes

Further reading 

 Anna Maria Bietti Sestieri, L'Italia nell'età del bronzo e del ferro : dalle palafitte a Romolo (2200-700 a.C.). with CD-ROM. Rome: Carocci. 2010.  .
 L. Barfield, Northern Italy Before Rome. London, Thames and Hudson, 1971
 B. Barich, "Il complesso industriale della stazione di Polada alla luce dei più recenti dati", Bollettino di Paleotnologia Italiana, 80, 22 (1971): 77-182.
 John M. Coles, A. F. Harding, The Bronze Age in Europe: an introduction to the prehistory of Europe, c. 2000-700 BC, Taylor & Francis, 1979 - 
 L. Fasani, "L'età del Bronzo", in Veneto nell'antichità, Preistoria e Protostoria, Verona 1984. 
 R. Peroni, L'età del bronzo nella penisola italiana I. L'antica età del bronzo, Florence, Olschki, 1971
 

Archaeological cultures of Southern Europe
Archaeological cultures in Italy
Bronze Age cultures of Europe
Italian culture
Italic archaeological cultures